Lars Benno Magnusson (born 4 February 1953) is a Swedish former footballer. He's a brother of fellow footballer Roger Magnusson.

Magnusson was a very popular player who got his breakthrough in Åtvidabergs FF when he became a Swedish champion 1972. He later became a professional in West Germany with Hertha BSC and FC Kaiserslautern.

He was a member of the Swedish national team in the 1974 FIFA World Cup.

After his retiring he has made appearances in TV-shows and now works for Svenska spel.

Magnusson, who played for the club Kalmar FF in the 1970s and 1980s, is one of the most legendary players in the history of the club. Therefore, the biggest Kalmar FF fan site has been named after him.

References

External links
 

1953 births
Living people
Swedish footballers
Sweden international footballers
1974 FIFA World Cup players
Åtvidabergs FF players
Hertha BSC players
1. FC Kaiserslautern players
Kalmar FF players
Allsvenskan players
Bundesliga players
Swedish expatriate footballers
Expatriate footballers in West Germany

Association football forwards
Swedish expatriate sportspeople in West Germany